José Francisco Porras Hidalgo (born 8 November 1970) is a Costa Rican retired footballer who last played for Carmelita in Costa Rica.

Currently, he is the technical secretary at Saprissa.

Club career
Porras made his debut in Costa Rica's Primera División for Herediano on 3 February 1991 against Guanacasteca and conceded his first league goal three days later against Saprissa. He played for Belén, Puntarenas and Carmelita during the 90s, before joining Saprissa in 1996. He returned to Carmelita in 2000 but rejoined Saprissa in 2002.

Porras spent several years on Saprissa's bench before being given his opportunity to shine. However, because Erick Lonnis, the star goalkeeper for Saprissa and Costa Rica, was at the pinnacle of his career, Porras had to patiently wait for his chance. After Lonnis's retirement, Porras managed to establish himself in both Saprissa's and the national team's goal. With Saprissa, he won three national championships, a UNCAF Cup and a CONCACAF Champions Cup title. With Porras in goal, Saprissa finished third in the FIFA Club World Championship 2005, behind São Paulo and Liverpool. He ended up playing 213 games for Saprissa.

In January 2009, Porras announced his retirement at the end of the 2009 Verano season. He won 9 league titles during his career, 8 with Saprissa and 1 with Herediano.

International career
Porras was a non-playing squad member at the 1989 FIFA World Youth Championship in Saudi Arabia.

He made his international debut for Costa Rica in a June 2004 friendly match against Nicaragua and earned a total of 33 caps, scoring no goals. He represented his country in 7 FIFA World Cup qualification matches and played in the 2006 FIFA World Cup after being named in coach Alexandre Guimarães's selection. He also played at the 2005 and 2007 UNCAF Nations Cup, as well as at the 2005 and 2007 CONCACAF Gold Cups and the 2004 Copa América.

His final international was a November 2007 friendly match against Panama.

Honours
 CONCACAF Gold Cup All-Tournament team (Honorable Mention): 2007

Personal life
Porras is a son of Naín Porras and Edith Hidalgo. He is married to Karla Sánchez and they have a daughter, Karol Sofía and Amanda.

References

External links
 

1970 births
Living people
People from Grecia (canton)
Association football goalkeepers
Costa Rican footballers
Costa Rica under-20 international footballers
Costa Rica international footballers
2004 Copa América players
2005 UNCAF Nations Cup players
2005 CONCACAF Gold Cup players
2006 FIFA World Cup players
2007 UNCAF Nations Cup players
2007 CONCACAF Gold Cup players
Copa Centroamericana-winning players
Liga FPD players
C.S. Herediano footballers
Belén F.C. players
Puntarenas F.C. players
A.D. Carmelita footballers
Deportivo Saprissa players